Michael Horatio Westmacott (12 April 1925 - 20 June 2012) was a prominent British mountaineer.

Westmacott was a member of the 1953 British Mount Everest Expedition led by John Hunt. He was educated at Radley College and Corpus Christi College, Oxford, where he read mathematics.

During World War II, Westmacott served as an officer with the British Indian Army Corps of Engineers in Burma.

He climbed extensively in the United Kingdom and the European Alps prior to Everest, and later opened new routes in Peru, the Hindu Kush and Alaska. He became president of the Alpine Club and the Climbers Club and worked for Shell International after he ceased serious mountaineering.

References

External links

 
 
 Royal Geographical Society 

1925 births
2012 deaths
English mountain climbers
Presidents of the Alpine Club (UK)
People educated at Radley College
Alumni of Corpus Christi College, Oxford
British Indian Army officers
Indian Army personnel of World War II
Sportspeople from Torquay
British people in British Burma